Cossonay-Penthalaz railway station is a railway station in the municipality of Penthalaz, in the Swiss canton of Vaud. It is an intermediate stop on multiple standard gauge lines of Swiss Federal Railways. The station is adjacent to the valley station of the Cossonay–Gare–Ville funicular.

Services 
 the following services stop at Cossonay-Penthalaz:

 RER Vaud:

References

External links 
 
 

Railway stations in the canton of Vaud
Swiss Federal Railways stations